Juwairiya binti Zulkifli is a Malaysian politician from the People's Justice Party (PKR), a component party of the Pakatan Harapan (PH) coalition who currently as member of Selangor State Assembly for Bukit Melawati since May 2018. She also appointed as the Political Secretary of the Menteri Besar of Selangor since 10 February 2021.

Election results

References 

1985 births
Living people
People from Selangor
Malaysian people of Malay descent
Malaysian Muslims
People's Justice Party (Malaysia) politicians
21st-century Malaysian women politicians
Women MLAs in Selangor
Members of the Selangor State Legislative Assembly